Jacob Banks Kurtz (October 31, 1867 – September 18, 1960) was a Republican member of the U.S. House of Representatives from Pennsylvania.

Biography
J. Banks Kurtz was born in Delaware Township, Juniata County, Pennsylvania.  He graduated from Dickinson College in Carlisle, Pennsylvania, and from Dickinson School of Law in 1893. While at school, Kurtz was a member of the Union Philosophical Society as well as the Phi Delta Theta and Delta Chi fraternities. He was admitted to the bar and commenced practice in Altoona, Pennsylvania.  He served as district attorney of Blair County, Pennsylvania from 1905 to 1912.  He was chairman of the committee of public safety and council of national defense for Blair County during the First World War.

Kurtz was elected as a Republican to the sixty-eighth United States Congress and to the five succeeding Congresses. He represented Pennsylvania's 21st congressional district (first 5 terms) and 23rd congressional district (final term). He was an unsuccessful candidate for reelection in 1934.  He resumed the practice of law, and was a delegate to the Republican National Conventions in 1936, 1940, and 1948. He served as city solicitor of Altoona from 1944 to 1946. He died in Altoona, with interment in Alto Reste Burial Park.

Personal life
In September 1895, Kurtz married Jennie Stockton and they had a daughter, Dorothy. J. Banks Kurtz.

References

Sources

The Political Graveyard

External links 
 

1867 births
1960 deaths
People from Juniata County, Pennsylvania
Politicians from Altoona, Pennsylvania
Pennsylvania lawyers
Republican Party members of the United States House of Representatives from Pennsylvania